Haruka Osawa (born 15 April 2001) is a Japanese professional footballer who plays as a forward for WE League club JEF United Chiba.

Club career 
Osawa made her WE League debut on 20 September 2021.

References 

WE League players
Living people
2001 births
Japanese women's footballers
Women's association football forwards
Association football people from Tokyo
JEF United Chiba Ladies players